The Sittingbourne School is a secondary school and sixth form with academy status located in Sittingbourne, Kent, with around 1600 students.

The school is part of the Swale Academies Trust which also includes Westlands Nursery, Westlands Primary School, Regis Manor Primary School, South Borough Primary School, Beaver Green Primary School, Westlands School and Meopham School.

References

External links
The Sittingbourne School website

Secondary schools in Kent
Sittingbourne
Academies in Kent